Muostakh Island (Russian: Остров Муостах), also spelled "Mostakh", is an island in the Buor-Khaya Gulf of the Laptev Sea. It is located off the eastern side of the Lena delta, enclosing the Tiksi Bay, about 35 km ESE of Tiksi.

Geography
Muostakh Island is long and narrow; its length is 13 km and its maximum breadth about 0.5 km on average. Off its southern tip lies a much smaller 2 km long island of similar characteristics.
The area where Muostakh Island lies, is subject to severe Arctic weather with frequent gales and blizzards. The sea in the bay is frozen for about nine months every year and often clogged with ice floes. There are 4 to 5 m wide baydzharakhs on the island.

Administratively Muostakh Island belongs to the Sakha Republic (Yakutia) of the Russian Federation. There is a weather and biological research station in Muostakh Island.

Heavy erosion
Geologically Muostakh Island is the remainder of an ancient great plain that was part of the Siberian continental about two thousand years ago. The strait which now separates the island from the mainland was just beginning to form at that time.
Nowadays its northern headland is subject to spectacular sea erosion, receding at a rate of 6 m a year. Sometimes the receding coastline exposes the bones and tusks of prehistoric animals such as mammoths.

References

Geographical data
Location
2006 Laptev Delta & East Siberian Sea Expedition; Muostakh Phase 
Muostakh Island erosion (with pictures)
 Ecotourism

Islands of the Laptev Sea
Islands of the Sakha Republic